The RMS Mauretania was an ocean liner that was launched on 28 July 1938 at the Cammell Laird yard in Birkenhead, England, and was completed in May 1939. She was one of the first ships built for the newly formed Cunard-White Star company following the merger in April 1934 of the Cunard and White Star Line.  On the withdrawal of the first  in 1935, to prevent a rival company using the name and to keep it available for the new liner, arrangements were made for the Red Funnel paddle steamer Queen to be renamed Mauretania in the interim.

The vessel was powered by two sets of Parsons single reduction-geared steam turbines giving  and driving twin propellers.

Design and construction (1937–1939) 

The second Mauretania was built by Cammell Laird of Birkenhead and was the largest ship built in England at that time. She was also the second new ship delivered to the combined Cunard-White Star Line. Mauretania was laid down on 24 May 1937 as Yard Number 1029. This new medium-sized Cunarder was launched on 28 July 1938 by Mary Bates, wife of the Cunard White Star chairman Percy Bates.

The ship was named Mauretania to honour the previous record breaking ocean liner which had been retired in 1935. The ship was designed for the London to New York City service and was the largest vessel ever to navigate the River Thames and use the Royal Docks. She was also intended to stand in for one of the Cunard Queens when they were undergoing maintenance.

The new Mauretanias smart and stylish accommodation marked a further enhancement to the standards of cabins, public rooms and general facilities provided for passengers of all grades by Cunard White Star Line.

World War II (1939–1947) 

Mauretania sailed on her maiden voyage from Liverpool to New York on 17 June 1939 under the command of Captain Arthur Tillotson Brown (who had delivered the previous Mauretania to the shipbreakers), after remaining in New York for a week she returned to Southampton via Cherbourg on Friday, 30 June 1939. Like , 25 years before, Mauretania was to experience only the briefest period of commercial operation before the outbreak of hostilities halted this work for over six years. Returning from the next voyage, Mauretania called at Southampton, Le Havre and finally London where she berthed in the King George V Dock. From August she was switched to the London- New York service for which she was intended.

On 11 August 1939 she left on her final prewar voyage to New York. She began her return voyage on September 30, and on October 2 the German english-language radio broadcast from Hamburg issued a veiled threat against her. On her return she was requisitioned by the government. Mauretania was armed with two  guns and some smaller weapons, painted in battle grey, and then despatched to America at the end of December 1939.

On 20 March 1940 she sailed from New York to Sydney, via Panama, to be converted for her new role. This conversion work was carried out in April and in May she left Sydney as part of one of the greatest convoys ever mustered for the transport of troops. With her were Queen Mary, Queen Elizabeth, and Aquitania, with 2,000 troops, bound for the River Clyde via South Africa. During the early stages of the war the ship transported Australian troops to Suez, India and Singapore but later she mainly served in the North Atlantic. In addition she shuttled Italian prisoners of war from the Middle East to South Africa, for internment, after their defeat in North Africa. Like Aquitania, she amassed over  during the course of her war duties, first crossing of the Indian Ocean, then working the Atlantic with American and Canadian troops and finally serving in the Pacific. During this epic voyage she established a speed record for the crossing time from Fremantle, Australia to Durban, South Africa. Another wartime troop transport voyage began in New York on 10 May 1943 and ended in Bombay on 24 June 1943, with calls en-route at Trinidad, Rio de Janeiro, Cape Town and Diego-Suarez. On 8 January 1944 she was involved in a minor collision with the American tanker Hat Creek in New York harbour.

During the World War II, she travelled  and carried over 340,000 troops.

After the war's end, Mauretania made several further voyages for the government repatriating troops. This mainly took the ship to Canada and Singapore. In addition, she made at least one voyage from New Zealand via Australia and South Africa to Liverpool. Women and children were crammed ten to a cabin in the bunks used by the troops, while the men were in "dormitories" for sixty, sleeping in hammocks. On that voyage she sailed from Cape Town on 10 September 1945. She was delayed for three days off Liverpool by strong winds, and finally docked on 25 September. Mauretania took the first dedicated sailing of British war brides and their children being patriated to Canada to join their husbands, landing at Pier 21 at Halifax, Nova Scotia in February 1946.

On 2 September 1946 she returned to Liverpool, was released from government service and immediately went into Gladstone Dock to be reconditioned by Cammell Laird & Co. for return to Cunard-White Star service.

Post-war (1947–1962) 

After a complete overhaul and refurbishment of the interior, Mauretania made her first post-war Atlantic crossing to New York City, departing on 26 April 1947. After using Liverpool as her home port for the first two voyages she was thereafter based at Southampton.
Later that year she began to be used as a cruise ship during the winter months to the West Indies and the Caribbean. These so-called 'dollar earning cruises' assisted the shattered British economy. In 1948 Mauretania was used to return home the Wright Brothers historic first aircraft, the 1903 Wright Flyer, where it had been on loan to the Science Museum since 1928. During the next decade she served on the Southampton to New York route during the summer months and operated on cruises from New York during the winter months. When Mauretania was taken in for her annual overhaul at Liverpool in December 1957 the opportunity was taken to fit air conditioning throughout the ship.

Cruising and retirement (1962–1965) 

By 1962, Mauretania was facing competition from more modern ships and was beginning to lose money for Cunard Line. In October 1962 the ship was painted pale green, like  (the famed Green Goddess), and the passenger accommodation was adjusted to accommodate 406 First class, 364 Cabin class and 357 Tourist class passengers. On 28 March 1963 she began a new Mediterranean service calling at New York, Cannes, Genoa and Naples. This was a failure, and by 1964 she was mainly employed cruising from New York to the West Indies.

Mauretanias final voyage was a Mediterranean cruise which left New York on 15 September 1965. It was announced that on her return to Southampton, Mauretania would be withdrawn from service and sold. She arrived at Southampton on 10 October 1965 and had already been sold to the British Iron & Steel Corporation. Leaving Southampton on 20 November for her final voyage, she arrived at Thos. W. Ward's shipbreaking yard in Inverkeithing, Fife, Scotland. She was commanded by Capt. John Treasure Jones who had been Master since 1962. He navigated the mud straits of the Forth without tugboats, and made the final berthing through the shallows above the mud banks on the midnight high tide. It is rumoured that on the way to Fife she sailed up the River Douglas in Lancashire by mistake and became grounded in the mud banks, but this is unlikely as photographs and footage of the Mauretania at Inverkeithing were taken after her arrival. Regardless, scrapping began a few weeks later. By late April 1966, her funnels were gone, By mid-1966, the superstructure was removed. Scrapping was finished by late 1966.

Post scrapping 

Furnishings from the ship were sold during and post scrapping.  Paneling, mill work, and other materials from the ship were used in the Famous-Barr department store's Mauretania Room at the West County Center Mall in Des Peres, Missouri, a suburb of St. Louis. The Mauretania Room was a 120 seat luxurious ladies tea room that opened with the store in 1969. The room was removed prior to the demolition and reconstruction of the mall in 2001 to make room for additional shopping as the times changed. The present location of these furnishings is unknown.

References

Further reading 

 
 Fricker, Philip J. Ocean Liners, Reed's Nautical Books, 1992
 Cruising Ships, W.H. Mitchell and L.A. Sawyer, Doubleday, 1967

 The Sea My Steed, by Captain Donald Sorrell. Robert Hale Ltd 1960.

External links 

 Greatships: Mauretania II on "The Great Ships" website
 Chris' Cunard Page
 Mauretania II on "The Cunarders" website
 Mauretania II on "The Great Ocean Liners" website

 

1938 ships
Ships built on the River Mersey
Ocean liners
Ships of the Cunard Line
Steamships